Calochortus splendens is a North American species of mariposa lily known by the common name splendid mariposa lily.

Calochortus splendens is native to coastal mountains and valleys of California and Baja California, as far north as Lake County.  It is found in various habitats, including chaparral and woodland.

Description
Calochortus splendens is a thin-stemmed lily with few leaves.

It bears flowers singly or in inflorescences of up to four. Each flower is ringed with smaller, ribbonlike, curling bracts. The bowl-shaped flowers are of varying shades of purple, often lavender, with a spot of darker purple at the base of each petal. The flower may have plentiful white hairs in the center and bright purple pollen.

References

External links
  Calflora Database: Calochortus splendens (Splendid mariposa lily)
Jepson Manual eFlora (TJM2) treatment of Calochortus splendens
USDA Plants Profile for Calochortus splendens (splendid mariposa lily)
UC Calphotos gallery: Calochortus splendens

splendens
Flora of California
Flora of Baja California
Natural history of the California chaparral and woodlands
Natural history of the Peninsular Ranges
Natural history of the California Coast Ranges
Natural history of the Transverse Ranges
Plants described in 1835
Taxa named by George Bentham
Flora without expected TNC conservation status